Phillip Lee Huffman (born June 20, 1958) is an American former professional baseball pitcher. He played two seasons in Major League Baseball (MLB) for the Toronto Blue Jays and Baltimore Orioles.

Early life and education 
Huffman played high school baseball in Texas for Brazoswood High School near his native Freeport, Texas.

Baseball career 
Huffman was drafted out of high school in Texas in June 1977 by the San Francisco Giants as the team's second-round draft pick. In 1977, Huffman made 10 starts for the Great Falls Voyagers in the Pioneer Baseball League, a Class A rookie league, going 7–3.

Huffman was part of a 7-for-1 transaction that sent him along with Gary Thomasson, Gary Alexander, Dave Heaverlo, John Henry Johnson, Alan Wirth and $300,000 to the Oakland Athletics for Vida Blue on March 15, 1978. Mario Guerrero was sent to the Athletics just over three weeks later on April 7 to complete the transaction.

Huffman began the 1978 season pitching with the Jersey City A's in the Eastern League AA league. Partway through the 1978 season, he was promoted to Oakland's AAA Vancouver Canadians minor-league club.

Huffman was traded along with Willie Horton from the Athletics to the Toronto Blue Jays for Rico Carty on August 15, 1978, and transferred to the Syracuse Chiefs.

1979 season 
Huffman made the Blue Jays' big-league roster in 1979 and remained with the team for the entire season. Overall, the season was a disappointment, as he went 6–18. He made 31 starts, posted a 5.77 earned-run average and gave up 25 home runs.

On August 27, 1979, Huffman pitched what easily was his best game in his major-league career, tossing a one-hitter against the Oakland Athletics in Toronto. Huffman posted his first win at Exhibition Stadium after six losses. Huffman retired the first 11 hitters, faced only 30 batters in total, and gave up the lone hit to Jim Essian in the sixth inning. He also walked Mike Heath and Mario Guerrero. The win was Huffman's final victory as a major league pitcher. "It's always great to beat a club you played with," Huffman said after the game. "I know all those guys over there. As for thinking of a no-hitter, I wasn't necessarily doing that. It's tough to pitch a no-hitter. I'm happy I got the shutout and only gave up one hit."

In 1980, Huffman was set to start the season with Toronto, but was optioned to the team's AAA farm club in Syracuse after manager Bobby Mattick chose to go with a four-man rotation.  "Phil has added a changeup to his pitching and he's been one of our top workers," Mattick said in April 1980. "But we want him to get a lot of work and he'll get it at Syracuse." Huffman never ended up joining the major-league staff during the 1980 season, however.

Huffman remained in the Blue Jays' system in 1981 as well, going 5–9 with a 5.69 earned run average while at Syracuse.

After Toronto 
On March 25, 1982, the Blue Jays traded Huffman to the Kansas City Royals for Rance Mulliniks. Huffman was assigned to the Royals' AAA Omaha Royals minor-league farm club, where he spent the entire season.  On April 2, 1983, the Royals released Huffman.

On May 24, 1983, Huffman signed as a free agent with the New York Mets. He pitched for the team's Tidewater Tides AAA farm club during 1983 and 1984. On July 13, 1984, the Baltimore Orioles purchased Huffman's contract from the Mets, and he finished out the season at Baltimore's Charlotte O's AA farm club.

1985 season 
In 1985, Huffman began the season with Baltimore's Rochester Red Wings AAA farm club. On July 10, 1985, Huffman was called up to the majors to fill the roster spot vacated by injured reliever Nate Snell. At the time, Huffman was 6–7 with Rochester. He then was recalled at the end of the season and pitched in just one more game, starting the October 3, 1985 second game of a doubleheader against the Boston Red Sox, being pulled from the game in the fifth inning after giving up an RBI single to future Hall of Famer Wade Boggs. For his 1985 major-league season, Huffman went 0-0 and posted a 15.43 earned run average in two games, pitching  innings, giving up seven hits, eight earned runs and striking out two.

Later career 
On June 26, 1987, Rochester released Huffman after he went 5–6 with a 4.78 earned run average. "Phil is one of the older, veteran pitchers," Rochester manager John Hart was quoted as saying. "He would be a stabilizing factor on the ballclub, but we just didn't feel at this time Phil would help us out at the big-league level."

After his release from Rochester, Huffman joined the Minnesota Twins' Portland Beavers AAA farm club for the balance of 1987, posting a 1–2 record with a 9.37 earned run average in nine games.  After 1987, Huffman stopped playing organized baseball.

Today 
By 2002, Huffman was living in Rochester, New York and was the supervisor for a welding supply company that distributes high-pressured liquid oxygen, nitrogen, carbon dioxide and flammable gas.

References

External links
, or Retrosheet, or Pura Pelota (Venezuelan Winter League)

1958 births
Living people
American expatriate baseball players in Canada
Baltimore Orioles players
Baseball players from Texas
Cardenales de Lara players
American expatriate baseball players in Venezuela
Charlotte O's players
Great Falls Giants players
Jackson Mets players
Jacksonville Suns players
Jersey City A's players
Major League Baseball pitchers
Omaha Royals players
People from Freeport, Texas
Portland Beavers players
Rochester Red Wings players
Syracuse Chiefs players
Tiburones de La Guaira players
Tidewater Tides players
Toronto Blue Jays players
Vancouver Canadians players